Mongiuffi Melia (Sicilian: Mungiuffi) is a comune (municipality) in the Metropolitan City of Messina in the Italian region Sicily, located about  east of Palermo and about  southwest of Messina.

References

Cities and towns in Sicily